CHFS is a file system developed at the Department of Software Engineering, University of Szeged, Hungary. It was the first open source flash memory-specific file system written for the NetBSD operating system.  Intended usage is over raw flash devices on embedded systems like ARM and MIPS, the filesystem is less suitable for use on consumer SSD (because consumer SSDs already make sure to not use the same physical blocks for writing modified data).

Structure
Similar to UBIFS, the CHFS file system utilizes a separate layer for handling Flash aging and bad blocks, called EBH (erase block handler). The file system itself is modelled after JFFS2, thus the internal structure is very similar.

ChewieFS
CHFS was originally called ChewieFS during development. The name was changed to avoid legal issues and to have a more neutral name.

See also 
 List of file systems
 NetBSD
 chfs AIX command line option for modifying filesystems

References

External links 
 
 ChewieFS - a JFFS2 like flash filesystem for NetBSD (Tamás Tóth, BSD-Day 2010)
 

Flash file systems
NetBSD